Roberto Alcaide García (born 22 March 1978 in Madrid) is a cyclist from Spain. He has a physical disability: He is a C4/LC2 type cyclist. He raced at the 2004 Summer Paralympics. He was the first racer to finish in the Individual Pursuit track LC2 race.  He finished second in the Combined Road LC2 race. He raced at the 2008 Summer Paralympics.  He was the second racer to finish in the Individual Pursuit track LC2 race.  He was the third racer to finish in the Road Trial LC2 race.  He raced at the 2012 Summer Paralympics. In November 2013, he was awarded a €8,000 scholarship from the Madrid Olympic Foundation to support his efforts to qualify for the 2016 Summer Paralympics.

References

External links 
 
 

Spanish male cyclists
Living people
1978 births
Paralympic gold medalists for Spain
Paralympic silver medalists for Spain
Paralympic bronze medalists for Spain
Cyclists at the 2004 Summer Paralympics
Cyclists at the 2008 Summer Paralympics
Cyclists at the 2012 Summer Paralympics
Cyclists from Madrid
Paralympic medalists in cycling
Medalists at the 2004 Summer Paralympics
Medalists at the 2008 Summer Paralympics
Paralympic cyclists of Spain